Stensund och Krymla is a locality situated in Trosa Municipality, Södermanland County, Sweden with 346 inhabitants in 2010.

References 

Populated places in Södermanland County
Populated places in Trosa Municipality